Andal "Datu Unsay" Uy Ampatuan Jr. (born August 15, 1976) is a Filipino convicted mass murderer and former politician. He is one of the main perpetrators of the Maguindanao massacre along with his father, brothers, and nephews. At the time of the massacre, he was the outgoing mayor of Datu Unsay, Maguindanao and was planning to run for provincial governor, the position his father, Andal Sr., was set to vacate.  Esmael Mangudadatu, from a rival political clan, declared his candidacy for the 2010 gubernatorial elections thus challenging Ampatuan for the post. The Ampatuans carried out the massacre to kill Mangudadatu.

On December 19, 2019, Andal Ampatuan Jr., alongside his brother Zaldy and other co-accused, were convicted of 57 counts of murder and sentenced to reclusión perpetua.

Role in the 2009 Maguindanao massacre

Ampatuan came to international attention in November 2009 as a result of the Maguindanao massacre. He was planning to run for governor of the province against Esmael Mangudadatu in the 2010 elections. However, Mangudadatu's female relatives and a group of journalists were ambushed and killed in the massacre, and Ampatuan quickly became the prime suspect. A member of the ruling Lakas-Kampi-CMD party, he and his father and brother were expelled by party chairman Gilberto Teodoro due to the massacre. He surrendered to Filipino authorities and was charged with murder. He has denied any involvement, though several witnesses have gone on record stating that they saw him at the scene of the crime. In September 2010 he went on trial as the prime suspect in the massacre. Ampatuan, through his emissaries, was already under fire for bribing the relatives of the massacre.

Personal life
Andal Jr. is the eighth of the eleven children of Andal Ampatuan Sr. with his first wife Bai Laila Uy-Ampatuan. Zaldy is his full-blooded brother. He has more than thirty other siblings through his father's five other wives.

Andal Jr.'s first wife, Reshal Santiago Ampatuan, served as mayor of Datu Unsay until her death due to cardiac arrest in 2018; she was 38. The couple had six children.

Their son, Andal V (nicknamed "Datu Aguak", the second of the six siblings), garnered the highest number of votes in the 2019 Datu Unsay municipal council elections. In July that year, the town's mayor and vice mayor resigned, citing "lack of capability to govern". In accordance with the Local Government Code, Andal V became the town's new mayor. The new vice mayor is also a relative of theirs: Janine Ampatuan Mamalapat.

Ampatuan has a second wife named Shahira.

Ampatuan declared his 2008 net worth as ₱39.3 million, making him the richest in his family. He had 16 properties in Davao City with a total market value of ₱11.22 million.

References

Andal Jr.
1976 births
Filipino mass murderers
Filipino Muslims
Lakas–CMD politicians
Living people
People from Maguindanao
Mayors of places in Maguindanao
Politicians convicted of murder
Filipino politicians convicted of crimes